In Greek mythology, the name Polycaon (Ancient Greek: Πολυκάων means "much-burning") may refer to the following individuals:

Polycaon, son of Lelex, king of Laconia, by the Naiad nymph, Cleochareia. Polycaon married an ambitious woman named Messene, daughter of King Triopas, of Argos. After his father's death, his brother Myles inherited the throne of Laconia. Messene, not wanting to be the wife of a simple anonymous man, collected an armed force from both Argos and Laconia. The newly married couple invaded the territory of which would be named after Polycaon's wife, Messenia. After establishing the newly conquered kingdom, they founded the city Andania, where they built their palace.
Polycaon, son of Butes. He married Evaechme, daughter of Hyllus and Iole (thus a granddaughter of Heracles).

Notes

References 

 Pausanias, Description of Greece with an English Translation by W.H.S. Jones, Litt.D., and H.A. Ormerod, M.A., in 4 Volumes. Cambridge, MA, Harvard University Press; London, William Heinemann Ltd. 1918. . Online version at the Perseus Digital Library
 Pausanias, Graeciae Descriptio. 3 vols. Leipzig, Teubner. 1903.  Greek text available at the Perseus Digital Library.

Princes in Greek mythology
Kings in Greek mythology
Laconian mythology
Messenian mythology